"Sing Sang Sung" is a summery pop anthem song by the French duo Air. It is the most successful song on their 2009 studio album Love 2. It was released from that album on August 25, 2009.

Music video
A music video was produced to promote the single. The video was directed by Petra Mrkyz and François Moriceau.

Track listing
 "Sing Sang Sung" (radio edit)

References

External links
 Pitchfork article on the song
 Pitchfork review of the song
 Stereogum article on the song
 Clash article on the song

2009 singles
Air (French band) songs
2009 songs
Virgin Records singles
Song recordings produced by Nigel Godrich
Songs written by Nicolas Godin
Songs written by Jean-Benoît Dunckel